is a Japanese writer and anime director.

Works

TV series 
 H2O: Footprints in the Sand (2008) (director)
 Dragon Crisis! (2011) (director)
 BlazBlue Alter Memory (2013) (director)
 Chaos Dragon (2015) (chief director)
 Armed Girl's Machiavellism (2017) (director)
 Circlet Princess (2019) (director)
 Is It Wrong to Try to Pick Up Girls in a Dungeon? (2019–2022) (director)
 The Honor Student at Magic High School (2021) (director)

Original video animation
 Higurashi no Naku Koro ni Kira (2011–2012) (director)
 Alice in Borderland (2014–2015) (director)
 Armed Girl's Machiavellism (2017) (director)

References

External links

Anime directors
Japanese writers
Living people
Year of birth missing (living people)